ISO 31-12 gives name, symbol and definition for 25 selected characteristic numbers used for the description of transport phenomena.

References 

00031-12